Laura Woods is an English presenter working for DAZN, ITV, Amazon Prime Video and Talksport. She currently hosts the Sports Breakfast show on Talksport on Monday, Tuesday and Wednesday with Ally McCoist.

Early life and education
Woods studied print journalism at Kingston University.

Career

Television
After graduating from university, Woods got a job at Sky Sports as runner in 2009, working her way up to editorial assistant, then into production as assistant producer, associate and producer.

She started presenting by doing behind-the-scenes interviews on the darts coverage for Sky Sports' YouTube channel.

Woods then got a job on the Saturday morning kids' show Game Changers. From there she started reporting on the NFL and joined the Soccer AM online presenting team, which included a trip to Euro 2016 in France where she broadcast live on Facebook every day.

By 2018, Woods became a regular pitch-side reporter on Super Sunday, occasionally reporting with Gary Neville. In 2022, she left Sky Sports.

Woods also works for DAZN, as part of their coverage of boxing and the Woman's Champions League.

On 17 August 2022, it was announced that Woods would be joining Osi Umenyiora and Jason Bell on an hour-long NFL highlights show every Friday on ITV.

Radio
In March 2020, Woods was announced as the main presenter for talkSPORT's breakfast show, presenting Monday to Wednesday, with Thursdays and Fridays presented by Alan Brazil.

Personal life
Woods dated former England Rugby player Alex Corbisiero for eight years.

Woods is a supporter of Arsenal F.C.

References

External links

M&C Saatchi Merlin

Living people
Year of birth missing (living people)
British television presenters
English radio presenters
People from Dagenham
Alumni of Kingston University
Sky Sports presenters and reporters
British women television presenters
British radio presenters
British women radio presenters